Stanley William Harris (1 March 1909 – 20 March 1964) was an Australian rules footballer who played with Richmond and Footscray in the Victorian Football League (VFL).

Family
The son of Charles Ernest Harris (1873-1943), and Florence Harris (1876-1954), née Harris, Stanley William Harris was born at St Kilda, Victoria on 1 March 1909.

He married Jessie Emma Brogan (1914-1959) in 1939.

His brother, John Dennis "Jiggy" Harris (1903-1993), was a VFL footballer with Collingwood and Hawthorn.

Football

Richmond (VFL)
He played in four First XVIII matches with Richmond in 1929, the first of which was against Footscray, at the Punt Road Oval, on 18 May 1929.

He also played in fourteen Second XVIII matches, including the 1929 Seconds Grand Final team, where (as forward pocket rover) he kicked 3 goals in Richmond's victory over Geelong, 12.8 (80) to 7.15 (57).

Footscray (VFL)
He cleared from Richmond to Footscray on 2 May 1930, and played in eight games with Footscray's First XVIII in that year.

Death
He died at Doncaster East, Victoria on 20 March 1964.

Notes

References
 Hogan P: The Tigers Of Old, Richmond FC, (Melbourne), 1996. 
 
 World War Two Nominal Roll: Leading Aircraftsman Stanley William Harris (11673), Department of Veterans' Affairs.

External links 

1909 births
1964 deaths
Australian rules footballers from Melbourne
Richmond Football Club players
Western Bulldogs players
People from St Kilda, Victoria